was a prominent Japanese academic, an art historian, curator, editor, and sometime public servant who specialized in the history of Japanese art.

Education

Professional career
From 1977 until his death in 1983, he served as Editorial Advisor for the same journal.

Tanaka was also an assiduous public servant and active researcher. Tokyo: Asahi Shinbunsha, 1978.
. Tokyo: Kōsei Shuppansha, 1978. (with Tatsumura Heizō)
. Tokyo: Idemitsu Bijutsukan, 1981.
. Tokyo: Nezu Institute of Fine Arts, 1981. (with Kawai Masatomo)
. Tokyo: Kōdansha, 1983. (edited with Tanikawa Tetsuzō, et al.)
. Tokyo: Kōdansha, 1983. (edited with Tanikawa Tetsuzō, et al.)
. Tokyo: Tanaka Ichimatsu Sensei Tsuitōshiki Sewanin kai, 1983. (posthumous publication)
. Tokyo: Kōdansha, 1984. (with Matsushita Takaaki, Nakamura Tanio, and Kanagawa Hiroshi)
, 2 vols. Tokyo: Chūō Kōron Bijutsu Shuppan, 1985-1986. (posthumously published; edited by Tanaka Ichimatsu Kaigashi Ronshū Kankōkai)

Notes

1895 births
1983 deaths
Japanese art historians
Japanese curators
Recipients of the Order of the Rising Sun, 3rd class
University of Tokyo alumni
Academic staff of Joshibi University of Art and Design
Academic staff of Nihon University
Academic staff of Tohoku University
Academic staff of Waseda University
Academic staff of Kanazawa College of Art
Academic staff of the University of Tokyo